The X-ray standing wave (XSW) technique can be used to study the structure of surfaces and interfaces with high spatial resolution and chemical selectivity. Pioneered by B.W. Batterman in the 1960s, the availability of synchrotron light has stimulated the application of this interferometric technique to a wide range of problems in surface science.

Basic principles 

An X-ray standing wave (XSW) field is created by interference between an X-ray beam impinging on a sample and a reflected beam. The reflection may be generated at the Bragg condition for a crystal lattice or an engineered multilayer superlattice; in these cases, the period of the XSW equals the periodicity of the reflecting planes. X-ray reflectivity from a mirror surface at small incidence angles may also be used to generate long-period XSWs.

The spatial modulation of the XSW field, described by the dynamical theory of X-ray diffraction, undergoes a pronounced change when the sample is scanned through the Bragg condition. Due to a relative phase variation between the incoming and reflected beams, the nodal planes of the XSW field shift by half the XSW period. Depending on the position of the atoms within this wave field, the measured element-specific absorption of X-rays varies in a characteristic way. Therefore, measurement of the absorption (via X-ray fluorescence or photoelectron yield) can reveal the position of the atoms relative to the reflecting planes. The absorbing atoms can be thought of as "detecting" the phase of the XSW; thus, this method overcomes the phase problem of X-ray crystallography.

For quantitative analysis, the normalized fluorescence or photoelectron yield  is described by 

,

Therefore, with a sufficiently large number of Fourier components being measured, XSW data can be used to establish the distribution of the different atoms in the unit cell (XSW imaging).

Experimental considerations 
XSW measurements of single crystal surfaces are performed on a diffractometer. The crystal is rocked through a Bragg diffraction condition, and the reflectivity and XSW yield are simultaneously measured. XSW yield is usually detected as X-ray fluorescence (XRF). XRF detection enables in situ measurements of interfaces between a surface and gas or liquid environments, since hard X-rays can penetrate these media. While XRF gives an element-specific XSW yield, it is not sensitive to the chemical state of the absorbing atom. Chemical state sensitivity is achieved using photoelectron detection, which requires ultra-high vacuum instrumentation.

Measurements of atomic positions at or near single crystal surfaces require substrates of very high crystal quality. The intrinsic width of a Bragg reflection, as calculated by dynamical diffraction theory, is extremely small (on the order of 0.001° under conventional X-ray diffraction conditions). Crystal defects such as mosaicity can substantially broaden the measured reflectivity, which obscures the modulations in the XSW yield needed to locate the absorbing atom. For defect-rich substrates such as metal single crystals, a normal-incidence or back-reflection geometry is used. In this geometry, the intrinsic width of the Bragg reflection is maximized. Instead of rocking the crystal in space, the energy of the incident beam is tuned through the Bragg condition. Since this geometry requires soft incident X-rays, this geometry typically uses XPS detection of the XSW yield.

Selected applications 
Applications which require ultra-high vacuum conditions:
 Physisorption and chemisorption studies 
 Diffusion of dopants in crystals 
 Superlattices and Quasi-crystal characterization

Applications which do not require ultra-high vacuum conditions:
 Langmuir-Blodgett films
 Self-assembled monolayers
 Model heterogeneous catalysts
 Buried interfaces

See also 
 List of surface analysis methods

References

Further reading

Laboratory techniques in condensed matter physics
Experimental physics
X-ray spectroscopy
Standing